Marjo Yli-Kiikka (born 16 June 1978) is a Finnish sports shooter. She competed at the 2004, 2008 and 2012 Summer Olympics.

References

External links
 

1978 births
Living people
People from Isokyrö
Finnish female sport shooters
Olympic shooters of Finland
Shooters at the 2004 Summer Olympics
Shooters at the 2008 Summer Olympics
Shooters at the 2012 Summer Olympics
Sportspeople from Ostrobothnia (region)